The kilogram per cubic metre (symbol: kg·m−3, or kg/m3) is the unit of density in the International System of Units (SI), defined by mass in kilograms divided by volume in cubic metres.

Conversions
1 kg/m3 = 1 g/L (exactly)
1 kg/m3 = 0.001 g/cm3 (exactly)
1 kg/m3 ≈ 0.06243 lb/ft3 (approximately)
1 kg/m3 ≈ 0.1335 oz/US gal (approximately)
1 kg/m3 ≈ 0.1604 oz/imp gal (approximately)

1 g/cm3 = 1000 kg/m3 (exactly)
1 lb/ft3 ≈ 16.02 kg/m3 (approximately)
1 oz/(US gal) ≈ 7.489 kg/m3 (approximately)
1 oz/(imp gal) ≈ 6.236 kg/m3 (approximately)

Relation to other measures
The density of water is about 1000 kg/m3 or 1 g/cm3, because the size of the gram was originally based on the mass of a cubic centimetre of water. 

In chemistry, g/cm3 is more commonly used.

See also
 Gram per cubic centimetre

References

External links
Official BIPM definition of the kilogram
Official BIPM definition of the metre

SI derived units
Units of chemical measurement
Units of density